Aa Chithrashalabham Parannotte is a 1970 Indian Malayalam film,  directed  and produced by P. Balthasar. The film stars Prem Nazir, Sheela, Kaviyoor Ponnamma and Adoor Bhasi in the lead roles. The film had musical score by G. Devarajan.

Cast

Prem Nazir as Chandran
Sheela as Indira
Kaviyoor Ponnamma as Lakshmi
Adoor Bhasi as Sankarankutty
Kottayam Santha as Ponnamma
Muthukulam Raghavan Pillai as Ramani
Prema as Narayani
Sankaradi as Keshava Kurup
Sreelatha Namboothiri as Mrs Moncy Digola
T. R. Omana as Gowriyamma
Alummoodan as Lukka
Bahadoor as Krishna Pillai
Nellikode Bhaskaran as Gangadharan
Radhamani as Asha
Khadeeja as Kuttyamma
Ushanandini as Usha

Soundtrack
The music was composed by G. Devarajan and the lyrics were written by Vayalar Ramavarma and K. Sivadas.

References

External links
 

1970 films
1970s Malayalam-language films